Kazimierz Zakrzewski (November 4, 1900 in Kraków – March 11, 1941 in Palmiry) was a Polish historian and publicist, a professor of the University of Warsaw. Zakrzewski was a co-originator of the Polish syndicalist movement, activist of the trade union Związek Związków Zawodowych, and researcher of ancient history (mainly late-ancient) and the Byzantine culture. He wrote Historia Bizancjum ("History of the Byzantine Empire") and co-authored the Polish popular history encyclopedia Wielka historia powszechna. During World War II, Zakrzewski was murdered by the Germans in a  mass execution at Palmiry.

References
 

1900 births
1941 deaths
20th-century Polish historians
Polish male non-fiction writers
Polish publicists
People killed by Nazi Germany
Polish Byzantinists

Scholars of Byzantine history